Bougainville Copper Limited (BCL) is a mining company of Papua New Guinea (PNG) that is listed on the Australian Securities Exchange (ASX). BCL operated the copper, gold and silver mine at the Panguna mine on Bougainville Island in PNG from 1971 to 1989. Mining operations were officially halted on 15 May 1989, due to militant activity and the mine has remained closed since.

Mining giant Rio Tinto Group, which was historically Bougainville Copper Limited's major shareholder, exited on 30 June 2016 when it transferred its 53.8 per cent shareholding for distribution to the Autonomous Bougainville Government and the Independent State of Papua New Guinea.

History 

The mine at Panguna was opened in 1972 and was majority-owned by Rio Tinto.

The mine was vitally important to the economy of Papua New Guinea. The PNG national government received a 20% share of profit from the mine, of which the Bougainvilleans received 5% - 1.25% share of the total profit.

The first Bougainville independence movement began to arise in the late 1960s, as people began to air their grievances against the then Australian colonial government over the handling of the Panguna mine. Australian External Territories Minister Charles Barnes was accused of telling the Bougainvillean people they would "get nothing". The issue of compensation went to the High Court of Australia, where it was found that the compensation was inadequate under ordinary federal Australian law, but that as an External Territory, Papua New Guinea was not guaranteed the same standards that applied to mainland Australia. Papua New Guinea has been an independent country since 16 September 1975.

In 2010, using interviews with BCL executives and internal company documents, Dr Kristian Lasslet of the University of Ulster published adverse findings about the company from during the period of civil war. This research suggested that BCL placed pressure on the PNG government to assert its authority on Bougainville, following acts of industrial sabotage. The company purportedly aided the security forces by providing them with trucks, fuel, accommodation, communications equipment, storage space, messing facilities and office resources after concerns about human rights abuses became apparent. These allegations were previously denied by BCL's former Chairman, but Dr Lasslett insists on their veracity.

In his first statement on Radio Australia Pacific Beat on 8 June 2010, the newly elected President of Bougainville, John Momis, declared that the Panguna mine has to be reopened to assure Bougainville's future economic growth.

A referendum on Bougainville's independence must be held no later than June 2020 under the Bougainville Peace Agreement.

During 2017, President Momis and the Autonomous Bougainville Government advocated for the re-opening of the Panguna mine.

In January 2018, the Bougainville government enacted an indefinite moratorium on renewing the licence of BCL over fears it could reignite violent civil conflict. Bougainville landowner groups were called to vote on allowing BCL to renew their mining licence and potentially reopen the Panguna mine, but lacked support. President Momis asserted that progressing with BCL could "cause a total explosion of the situation again". The moratorium is a dramatic turnaround in policy from the Autonomous Bougainville Government, which determined landowners felt BCL didn't deserve a social licence to run the mine.

In February 2018, BCL begun legal proceedings against the Autonomous Bougainville Government following the cancellation of the exploration license.

See also

References

External links
  Bougainville Copper Limited
 European Shareholders of Bougainville Copper (ESBC)
  Bougainville Copper Limited - All Annual Reports since 1967
 Blood and Treasure - SBS documentary 2011

Copper mining companies of Papua New Guinea
Companies listed on the Australian Securities Exchange
History of Papua New Guinea
Autonomous Region of Bougainville
Rio Tinto (corporation) subsidiaries